William Laidler Leaf (1791-1874) was a wealthy silk merchant and philanthropist.

Biography
He lived in Streatham, south London and had a holiday home on Eastbourne's Grand Parade.

He was closely associated with the temperance movement and funded the construction of the Leaf Hall in Eastbourne.

He is buried in West Norwood Cemetery.

References

External links 
http://sueyounghistories.com/archives/2008/07/26/william-leaf-and-homeopathy/

1791 births
1874 deaths
English philanthropists
English merchants
English temperance activists
19th-century British philanthropists
Burials at West Norwood Cemetery
19th-century English businesspeople